Ampelopsis glandulosa var. brevipedunculata, with common names creeper, porcelain berry, Amur peppervine, and wild grape, is an ornamental plant, native to temperate areas of Asia.  	
It is generally similar to, and potentially confused with, grape species (genus Vitis) and other Ampelopsis species.

Description 

Ampelopsis glandulosa is a deciduous, woody, perennial climbing vine with flowers and tendrils opposite the palmately lobed leaves, which have 3 to 5 more or less deep lobes and coarsely toothed margins (with a small apicle). Porcelain berry climbs via tendrils to a height of 4-6m (15-20 ft). The tendrils cling to the supports by non-adhesive tendrils similar to those of Vitis vines. The tendrils are opposite the leaves and have two or three branches.

The inflorescence is a corymbiform cyme, attached opposite a leaf. Flowers are small, green-white, born in umbels opposite the leaves, and appear in June through August. Fruits are 4-8mm in diameter, circular, containing 2-4 seeds, and may be many colors including green, blue, purple, pink or yellow with black or brown speckles; many different colors are present on the same plant. The berries are produced in late summer and fall. The seeds are dispersed by birds.

Porcelain berry can be confused with native grapes based on leaf shape but can be differentiated by cutting the stem and observing the pith.  Grapes have brown or tan pith but porcelain berry has white pith. Porcelainberry bark is also covered in lenticels and does not peel, unlike grape bark.

Distribution and habitat
Porcelainberry grows primarily in marginal habitats such as forest edges, pond margins, stream banks, thickets, and other areas of full sunlight to partial shade. It does not grow in permanently wet soils or heavily shaded areas, and is not typically found in the interiors of mature forests.

Porcelain berry is found natively in China, Korea, Japan and the Russian Far East. It was introduced in 1870s to the United States as a landscape plant. Its invasive range extends from Wisconsin and Iowa at its westernmost extent to the Atlantic coastline at the east, where it is found from New Hampshire to Georgia.

Cultivation 
Ampelopsis glandulosa var. brevipedunculata has distinctive medium blue fruit, and is an ornamental plant used in gardens to garnish the walls and arbours. Porcelain berry is still widely cultivated despite knowledge of its invasiveness.
If not properly managed it will become dominant on, and kill smaller trees. It will climb larger trees to the top.

The variety A. brevipedunculata "Elegans" is less vigorous than the type species. It has smaller leaves, mottled in white and pink, and it is more sensitive to frost. Porcelain berry often co-exists with Virginia creeper, poison ivy and sassafras.

Conservation 
It is a major invasive plant species in parts of the Eastern United States. It is invasive in urban settings as well as in more pastoral settings. Porcelain berry is often found in disturbed areas such as roadsides, old fields, and floodplains where sunlight is abundant. The traits that make it a popular garden plant, such as its ground coverage, climbing habit, pest resistance, and tolerance of adverse conditions, also make it a robust invasive species. Invasive porcelainberry tends to shade out and kill shrubs and younger trees, and larger growths will climb over larger plants, cover them, and potentially kill by blocking sunlight. Birds consume the seeds of porcelain berry and act as a vector to transport it. See zoochory.

Chemistry
The unusual blue color of the berries is due to an anthocyanidins-flavonols copigmentation phenomenon.

Ampelopsin A, B and C are stilbene oligomers found in A. glandulosa var hancei (formerly A. brevipedunculata var. hancei).

References 

 

glandulosa var. brevipedunculata
Garden plants of Asia
Flora of India (region)
Flora of China
Flora of Japan
Flora of Nepal
Flora of Vietnam